William A. Crombie (April 20, 1844 - January 3, 1914) was a businessman and local government official in Burlington, Vermont. A Republican, among the offices in which he served was mayor of Burlington (1889-1891).

Early life
William August Crombie, was born in New Boston, New Hampshire on April 20, 1844 a son of Samuel Coolidge Crombie (1814-1879) and Susan Augusta (Choate) Crombie (1818-1857). When he was six years old, his parents moved the family to Nashua, New Hampshire. Crombie was educated at Pinkerton Academy in Derry, New Hampshire, and at Nashua High School.

Business career
At age 16, Crombie joined the Boston, Lowell & Nashua Railway. Beginning with an entry-level position as a tally clerk in the freight department, he worked his way through the department's ranks to become a cashier. He remained with the railroad until 1864, when he moved to Burlington, Vermont.

After becoming a resident of Burlington, Crombie began a career in the lumber business as an employee of L. Barnes & Co. a company owned by Lawrence Barnes, who also operated several other prominent Burlington enterprises. In 1869, Barnes sold L. Barnes & Co. to the owners of a new venture, Shepard, Davis & Company, where Crombie continued to work. In 1876, Shepard, Davis was succeeded by a new company, Shepard & Morse Lumber Company, which included Crombie and George H. Morse as managing partners. Crombie was also an investor, partner, or board of directors member for several other businesses, including the Burlington Shade Roller Company, Porter Manufacturing Company, Baldwin Refrigerator Company, Vermont Life Insurance Company, American Milk Sugar Company, and Brush Electric Light and Power Company.

Political career
Crombie was active in Burlington's politics and government as a Republican and attended several city and Chittenden County conventions as a delegate. He was a member of Burlington's board of school commissioners and served as the board's clerk. In 1886, Crombie was appointed aide-de-camp with the rank of colonel on the military staff of Governor Ebenezer J. Ormsbee, and he served until 1888.

In 1889 he was elected to a one-year term as mayor of Burlington, an office previously held by George Morse. He was nominated unanimously by Burlington's Republican Party and in the general election he defeated Democratic nominee Seneca Haselton by 1126 votes (61.5%) to 705 (38.5%). In 1890, he was easily renominated, and in the general election defeated Democrat Elliot M. Sutton by 1041 (56%) votes to 817 (44%). Crombie served as mayor from April 1889 to April 1891.

Later career
In 1894, Crombie relocated to New York City, where he owned and operated the W. M. Crombie & Company wholesale lumber dealership is partnership with his sons and George Morse. He maintained his interest in politics, and became the Republican committee leader of the 19th Assembly District and a member of the New York County Republican Committee's executive committee.

Crombie was a member of several civic, political, and fraternal organizations. A partial list includes The Union League Club, Lumbermen's Club of New York City, West Side Republican Club, Sons of the American Revolution, Vermont Society of New York City, Lake Champlain Association, Burlington YMCA, Burlington Young Men's Association, and Merchants' Association of New York City.

Death and burial
Crombie died in New York City on January 3, 1914. Funeral services were held at the Church of the Divine Paternity in Manhattan and Burlington's Unitarian Church. Honorary pallbearers in Burlington included Urban A. Woodbury, Theodore S. Peck, and William J. Van Patten.  He was buried at Lakeview Cemetery in Burlington.

Family
On June 2, 1868, Crombie married Sarah Elizabeth "Lizzie" Murray (1846-1907) of Nashua, a daughter of Orlando Dana and Mary Jane (Witherbee) Murray. They were the parents of three children, including William Murray Crombie (1871-1939) and Arthur Choate Crombie (1873-1939), who were partners in Crombie's New York City lumber business, and Maude Elizabeth (1881-1966), the wife of first George Franklin Ladue and later Charles Ellmaker Willis.

Notes

References

Sources

Books

Newspapers

External links

1844 births
1914 deaths
People from New Boston, New Hampshire
People from Nashua, New Hampshire
Politicians from Burlington, Vermont
Vermont Republicans
19th-century American politicians
Mayors of Burlington, Vermont
Burials at Lakeview Cemetery (Burlington, Vermont)
Pinkerton Academy alumni